Minneola may refer to:

 a variety of tangelo

Places in the United States
 Minneola, former name of Alleene, Arkansas
 Minneola, Florida
 Minneola, Clark County, Kansas
 Minneola, Franklin County, Kansas
 Minneola Township, Goodhue County, Minnesota

See also
Mineola (disambiguation)